Antonis Georgallides (born January 30, 1982, in Cyprus) is a Cypriot retired football goalkeeper who played for the Cypriot National Team. He also played for six years for Anorthosis and one year for Platanias in Greece. On 21 April 2014, Antonis Georgallides returned to Omonia and signed a two-year contract.

International career
He has represented Cyprus at youth level. He is the senior goalkeeper for Cyprus national football team.

Honours
Anorthosis Famagusta:
 Cypriot Championship: 2000, 2005
 Cypriot Cup: 2002, 2003

AC Omonia
 Cypriot Championship: 2010
 Cypriot Cup: 2011, 2012
 Cypriot Super Cup: 2010

AEK Larnaca
 Cypriot Cup: 2017–18

References

External links
 Fan Club
 

1982 births
Living people
Cypriot footballers
Cyprus international footballers
Cypriot First Division players
AC Omonia players
AEK Larnaca FC players
Alki Larnaca FC players
Anorthosis Famagusta F.C. players
Platanias F.C. players
Cypriot expatriate footballers
Expatriate footballers in Greece
Super League Greece players
Association football goalkeepers
People from Larnaca
Olympiakos Nicosia players